The Hyundai Rotem EMU (also known as R-Train or 1141B) is a current model of heavy rail electric multiple units used on the Mass Transit Railway in Hong Kong. The 9-car sets are manufactured by Hyundai Rotem for the North South Corridor, an extension of the East Rail line, at a cost of HK$4 billion. and the first delivery took place in 2015, while a further 6 trains were ordered in May 2020. Originally scheduled to enter service in late-2017 to early-2018, the trains gradually entered service from 6 February 2021. All train sets were put into service in 2022, replacing the Metro Cammell EMUs and displacing the SP1900 EMUs to the Tuen Ma Line.

Formation 
The formation ranges from D001/D003 (Trainset 1) to D127/D129 (Trainset 43). Like the previous SP1900s and Metro Cammell EMUs, one car is still reserved for the first class in each train set. The 9-car formation is shorter than the previous 12-car East Rail Line trains, due to space constraints imposed by new underground platforms on the Sha Tin to Central Link. There are concerns that the new formation may worsen the existing overcrowding problem. However, the Transport and Housing Bureau and MTRC suggest that the new signaling system and higher train speeds will increase the train frequency from three minutes down to two minutes. It is also estimated that with the completion of the Sha Tin to Central Link (Tai Wai – Hung Hom section), 20% of the current East Rail line passengers will take the new East West Corridor.

Design and features 

The Hyundai Rotem EMU train will be more advanced than the existing trains.
The exterior of these trains is similar to that of the C-trains, including the presence of emergency exits, the first new trains on the ex-KCR network to be so equipped (though such doorways existed on the pre-refurbished Metro Cammell trains). They are painted in the same livery as those operating on the South Island line. The cab ends, though, show some small differences, including a slightly angled front end and modified headlight cluster.
Train doors on this stock are more evenly distributed, similar to pre-merger MTR trains. This is especially noticeable in the first class compartment, where the doors are painted yellow to distinguish from standard class. The location of the doors in the first class compartment allow both to be used for normal boarding, which is not possible using the offset arrangement of previous sets.
Seats near gangway connections are placed horizontally, making room for standing space.
Train compartment will be wider than existing trains, increasing capacity. This will also allow for safer boarding and alighting at stations with curved platforms due to a narrower platform gap, such as at University Station and Mong Kok East Station.
All lighting will use eco-friendly LEDs instead of incandescent lighting.
27-inch LCD display screen is installed for MTR In-Train TV.
Dynamic route maps and improved grab poles that branch out into two in the centre.

References 

MTR rolling stock
Electric multiple units of Hong Kong
25 kV AC multiple units
Hyundai Rotem multiple units